Jakob's Wife is a 2021 American vampire horror film directed and produced by Travis Stevens from a screenplay by Stevens, Kathy Charles, and Mark Steensland. The film stars Barbara Crampton, Larry Fessenden, and Bonnie Aarons.

The film had its world premiere at South by Southwest on March 17, 2021; it was released in theaters, on demand, and digitally in the United States by RLJE Films and Shudder on April 16, 2021.

Plot
Anne, married to a small-town Minister, feels her life has been shrinking over the past 30 years. Encountering "The Master" brings her a new sense of power and an appetite to live bolder. However, the change comes with a heavy body count.

Cast
 Barbara Crampton as Anne Fedder
 Larry Fessenden as Pastor Jakob Fedder
 Bonnie Aarons as The Master
 Nyisha Bell as Amelia Humphries
 Sarah Lind as Carol Fedder
 Mark Kelly as Bob Fedder
 Robert Rusler as Tom Low
 Jay DeVon Johnson as Sheriff Mike Hess
 CM Punk as Deputy Colton
 Omar Salazar as Oscar
 Ned Yousef as Naveed Al Amin
 Giovannie Cruz as Mariana Al Amin
 Armani Desirae as Little Girl
 Monica L. Henry as Dr. Meda
 Skeeta Jenkins as Butcher
 Kathe Newcomb as Mattie
 Morgan Peter Brown
 Angelie Denizard as Eli

Release
The film had its world premiere at South by Southwest on March 17, 2021, with RLJE Films and Shudder acquiring the US distribution rights the month before. It was released in theaters, on demand, and digitally in the United States by RLJE Films and Shudder on April 16, 2021.

Reception
Review aggregator website Rotten Tomatoes reported that 86% of 70 critics gave the film a positive review, with an average rating of 6.9/10. The site's critic consensus reads: "Jakob's Wife gives genre legend Barbara Crampton an opportunity to carry an old-school horror storyand she bloody well delivers." Metacritic assigned the film a weighted average score of 59 out of 100 based on 14 critics, indicating "mixed or average reviews".

The Guardian gave the film 3/5 stars and said "as a comic, genre-inflected study of middle-aged female rage, it’s a gas." The Los Angeles Times praised the performances of the leads while calling the themes "a bit simplistic." /Film gave the film 6.5 out of 10 and called it "a showcase for its legendary leads." Variety negatively reviewed the film calling it "a fairly bland journey-of-self-fulfillment" and " iron-deficient."

References

External links
 
 

2021 films
2021 horror thriller films
American horror thriller films
2021 independent films
American independent films
American vampire films
2020s English-language films
2020s American films